Al bar dello sport (At the Bar Sport) is a 1983 Italian comedy film directed by Francesco Massaro.

Plot 
Misadventures of Lino, a penniless Apulian immigrant in Turin, after he won 1.3 billion lire at Totocalcio.

Cast 

 Lino Banfi: Lino
 Jerry Calà: Parola
 Mara Venier: Rossana 
 : Felice 
 : Bianca 
 Pino Ammendola: Gaetano		
 Annie Belle: Martine
 : Ciccio 
 Enzo Andronico: Mr. Andronico
 Maurizio Mauri : Leo
 Annie Belle : Martine, a French prostitute
 Andrea Ciccolella : Marcolino, Lino's nephew
 
 Leonardo Cassio : Don Raffaele
 Enzo Andronico : Mr. Andronico, the fishmonger
  : Notary Magalini
 Ennio Antonelli : Don Raffaele's henchman
  : Don Raffaele's henchman

References

External links

Italian comedy films
1983 comedy films
1983 films
Films directed by Francesco Massaro
Films set in Turin
1980s Italian films